The Fullers Earth Formation is a geological formation that outcrops in southern England. It is also mostly present in the subsurface of the Wessex Basin and offshore in the English Channel Basin, Celtic Sea Basin and St George's Channel Basin. It preserves fossils dating back to the Bathonian stage of the Middle Jurassic series such as the pterosaur Dolicorhamphus. It is the lateral equivalent of the Rutland Formation, Sharp's Hill Formation, Calcaire d’Ecouché, and Calcaire de Caen

See also

 List of fossiliferous stratigraphic units in England

References

 

Jurassic England
Bathonian Stage